Myton is a surname. Notable people with the surname include:

Cedric Myton (born 1947), Jamaican musician
Fred Myton (1885–1955), American screenwriter
Neville Myton (1946–2021), Jamaican middle-distance runner

See also
Maton (surname)